Franz Schubert's compositions of 1817 are mostly in the Deutsch catalogue (D) range D 511–598, and include:
 Instrumental works:
 Symphony No. 6, D 589 (composition started in October 1817)
 String Trio, D 581
 Violin Sonata in A major, D 574
 Piano Sonata in A minor, D 537
 Piano Sonata in A-flat major, D 557
 Piano Sonata in E minor, D 566
 Piano Sonata in D-flat major, D 568
 Piano Sonata in E-flat major, D 568
 Piano Sonata in F-sharp minor, D 571
 Piano Sonata in B major, D 575
 Vocal music:
 "Der Tod und das Mädchen", D 531
 "An die Musik", D 547
 "Die Forelle", D 550 (not all versions of this Lied were composed in 1817)

Table

Legend

List

|-
| 511
| 511
| data-sort-value="ZZZZ" |
| data-sort-value="ZZZZ" |
| data-sort-value="726,00" | VII/2, 6
| data-sort-value="Ecossaise, D 511" | Écossaise, D 511
| data-sort-value="key E-flat major" | E major
| data-sort-value="1817-01-01" | 
| For piano
|-
| 513
| 513
| data-sort-value="XXX,1891" | (1891)
| data-sort-value="1600,019" | XVINo. 19
| data-sort-value="303,74" | III, 3 Anh. II No. 4
| data-sort-value="Pastorella al prato, La, D 513" | La pastorella al prato, D 513
| data-sort-value="text La pastorella al prato 1" | La pastorella al prato
| data-sort-value="1817-01-01" | 1817?
| data-sort-value="Text by Goldoni, Carlo from Il filosofo di campagna II, 16, La pastorella al prato 1" | Text by Goldoni, from Il filosofo di campagna II, 16; For ttbb and piano
|-
| data-sort-value="999.05131" |
| data-sort-value="513.1" | 513A
| data-sort-value="ZZZZ" |
| data-sort-value="ZZZZ" |
| data-sort-value="411,00" | IV, 11
| Nur wer die Liebe kennt
| data-sort-value="text Nur wer die Liebe kennt" | Nur wer die Liebe kennt
| data-sort-value="1817-01-01" | 1817?
| data-sort-value="Text by Werner, Zacharias, Nur wer die Liebe kennt" | Text by Werner; Sketch
|-
| 514
| 514
| data-sort-value="007,1823-1" | 7,1(1823)
| data-sort-value="2005,300" | XX, 5No. 300
| data-sort-value="401,0071" | IV, 1a
| data-sort-value="Abgebluhte Linde, Die" | Die abgeblühte Linde
| data-sort-value="text Wirst du halten, was du schwurst" | Wirst du halten, was du schwurst
| data-sort-value="1817-01-01" | 1817?
| data-sort-value="Text by Szechenyi, Ludwig von, Wirst du halten, was du schwurst" | Text by 
|-
| 515
| 515
| data-sort-value="007,1823-2" | 7,2(1823)
| data-sort-value="2005,301" | XX, 5No. 301
| data-sort-value="401,0072" | IV, 1a
| data-sort-value="Flug der Zeit, Der" | Der Flug der Zeit
| data-sort-value="text Es floh die Zeit im Wirbelfluge" | Es floh die Zeit im Wirbelfluge
| data-sort-value="1817-01-01" | 1817?
| data-sort-value="Text by Szechenyi, Ludwig von, Es floh die Zeit im Wirbelfluge" | Text by 
|-
| 516
| 516
| data-sort-value="008,1822-2" | 8,2(1822)
| data-sort-value="2006,386" | XX, 6No. 386
| data-sort-value="401,0082" | IV, 1a &Anh. No. 5
| data-sort-value="Sehnsucht, D 516" | Sehnsucht, D 516
| data-sort-value="text Der Lerche wolkennahe Lieder" | Der Lerche wolkennahe Lieder
| data-sort-value="1816-01-01" | 1816?
| data-sort-value="Text by Mayrhofer, Johann, Der Lerche wolkennahe Lieder" | Text by Mayrhofer
|-
| 517
| 517
| data-sort-value="013,1822-1" | 13,1(1822)(1972)
| data-sort-value="2005,293" | XX, 5No. 293
| data-sort-value="401,0131" | IV, 1a
| data-sort-value="Schafer und der Reiter, Der" | Der Schäfer und der Reiter
| data-sort-value="text Ein Schafer sass im Grunen" | Ein Schäfer saß im Grünen
| data-sort-value="1817-04-01" | April 1817
| data-sort-value="Text by Motte Fouque, Friedrich de la, Ein Schafer sass im Grunen" | Text by Motte Fouqué; Two versions: 2nd, in AGA, is Op. 13 No. 1
|-
| 518
| 518
| data-sort-value="XXX,1824" | (1824)
| data-sort-value="2005,326" | XX, 5No. 326
| data-sort-value="405,00" | IV, 5
| An den Tod
| data-sort-value="text Tod, du Schrecken der Natur" | Tod, du Schrecken der Natur
| data-sort-value="1816-01-01" | 1816 or 1817
| data-sort-value="Text by Schubart, Christian Friedrich Daniel, Tod, du Schrecken der Natur" | Text by Schubart; For b and piano
|-
| 519
| 519
| data-sort-value="173,1867-5" | 173p,5(1867)
| data-sort-value="2005,299" | XX, 5No. 299
| data-sort-value="411,00" | IV, 11
| data-sort-value="Blumensprache, Die" | Die Blumensprache
| data-sort-value="text Es deuten die Blumen des Herzens Gefuhle" | Es deuten die Blumen des Herzens Gefühle
| data-sort-value="1817-01-01" | 1817?
|-
| 520
| 520
| data-sort-value="XXX,1850" | (1850)(1895)
| data-sort-value="2005,289" | XX, 5No. 289
| data-sort-value="411,00" | IV, 11
| Frohsinn
| data-sort-value="text Ich bin von lockerem Schlage" | Ich bin von lockerem Schlage
| data-sort-value="1817-01-01" | January1817
| data-sort-value="Text by Castelli, Ignaz Franz, Ich bin von lockerem Schlage" | Text by Castelli; Two versions: 1st in AGA
|-
| 521
| 521
| data-sort-value="XXX,1830" | (1830)(1895)
| data-sort-value="2005,290" | XX, 5No. 290
| data-sort-value="303,16" | III, 3 No. 16Anh. I No. 6
| Jagdlied
| data-sort-value="text Trarah! Trarah! Wir kehren daheim" | Trarah! Trarah! Wir kehren daheim
| data-sort-value="1817-01-01" | January1817
| data-sort-value="Text by Werner, Zacharias from Wanda, Konigin der Sarmaten I, Trarah! Trarah! Wir kehren daheim" | Text by Werner, from Wanda, Königin der Sarmaten I (other text in 1830 ed.); For voice (or: unison choir) and piano
|-
| 522
| 522
| data-sort-value="XXX,1895" | (1895)
| data-sort-value="2005,291" | XX, 5No. 291
| data-sort-value="411,00" | IV, 11
| data-sort-value="Liebe, Die, D 522" | Die Liebe, D 522
| data-sort-value="text Wo weht der Liebe hoher Geist?" | Wo weht der Liebe hoher Geist?
| data-sort-value="1817-01-01" | January1817
| data-sort-value="Text by Leon, Franz Gottlieb von, Wo weht der Liebe hoher Geist?"| Text by 
|-
| 523
| 523
| data-sort-value="XXX,1885" | (1885)
| data-sort-value="2005,292" | XX, 5No. 292
| data-sort-value="411,00" | IV, 11
| Trost, D 523
| data-sort-value="text Nimmer lange weil' ich hier" | Nimmer lange weil' ich hier
| data-sort-value="1817-01-01" | January1817
| data-sort-value="ZZZZ" |
|-
| 524
| 524
| data-sort-value="013,1822-3" | 13,3(1822)(1895)(1970)
| data-sort-value="2005,295" | XX, 5No. 295
| data-sort-value="401,0133" | IV, 1a &b No. 12
| data-sort-value="Alpenjager, Der, D 524" | Der Alpenjäger, D 524
| data-sort-value="text Auf hohem Bergesrucken" | Auf hohem Bergesrücken
| data-sort-value="1817-01-01" | January1817
| data-sort-value="Text by Mayrhofer, Johann, Auf hohem Bergesrucken" | Text by Mayrhofer; Three versions: 2nd, not in AGA, is for b and piano – 3rd is Op. 13 No. 3
|-
| 525
| 525
| data-sort-value="021,1823-3" | 21,3(1823)(1970)
| data-sort-value="2005,296" | XX, 5No. 296
| data-sort-value="401,0213" | IV, 1a &b No. 18
| Wie Ulfru fischt
| data-sort-value="text Der Angel zuckt, die Rute bebt" | Der Angel zuckt, die Rute bebt
| data-sort-value="1817-01-01" | January1817
| data-sort-value="Text by Mayrhofer, Johann, Der Angel zuckt, die Rute bebt" | Text by Mayrhofer; For b and piano; Two versions: 2nd, in AGA, is Op. 21 No. 3
|-
| 526
| 526
| data-sort-value="XXX,1832" | (1832)
| data-sort-value="2005,297" | XX, 5No. 297
| data-sort-value="411,00" | IV, 11
| Fahrt zum Hades
| data-sort-value="text Der Nachen drohnt" | Der Nachen dröhnt
| data-sort-value="1817-01-01" | January1817
| data-sort-value="Text by Mayrhofer, Johann, Der Nachen drohnt" | Text by Mayrhofer; For b and piano
|-
| 527
| 527
| data-sort-value="024,1823-2" | 24,2(1823)(1975)
| data-sort-value="2005,298" | XX, 5No. 298
| data-sort-value="402,0242" | IV, 2a &b No. 2
| Schlaflied a.k.a. Abendlied a.k.a. Schlummerlied
| data-sort-value="text Es mahnt der Wald" | Es mahnt der Wald
| data-sort-value="1817-01-01" | January1817
| data-sort-value="Text by Mayrhofer, Johann, Es mahnt der Wald" | Text by Mayrhofer; Two versions: 2nd, in AGA, is Op. 24 No. 2
|-
| 528
| 528
| data-sort-value="XXX,1872" | (1872)
| data-sort-value="2010,574" | XX, 10No. 574
| data-sort-value="411,00" | IV, 11
| data-sort-value="Pastorella al prato, La, D 528" | La pastorella al prato, D 528
| data-sort-value="text La pastorella al prato 2" | La pastorella al prato
| data-sort-value="1817-01-01" | January1817
| data-sort-value="Text by Goldoni, Carlo from Il filosofo di campagna II, 16, La pastorella al prato 2" | Text by Goldoni, from Il filosofo di campagna II, 16; Arietta for soprano and piano
|-
| 529
| 529
| data-sort-value="XXX,1871" | (1871)(1897)
| data-sort-value="1200,011b" | XIINo. 11XXI, 3No. 30
| data-sort-value="726,00" | VII/2, 6
| data-sort-value="Ecossaises, 08, D 529" | Eight Écossaises, D 529
| data-sort-value="key I" | Various keys
| data-sort-value="1817-02-01" | February1817
| For piano; Nos. 1–3, 6 and 8 publ. 1871
|-
| 530
| 530
| data-sort-value="109,1829-3" | 109p,3(1829)
| data-sort-value="2004,273" | XX, 4No. 273
| data-sort-value="411,00" | IV, 11
| An eine Quelle
| data-sort-value="text Du kleine grunumwachs'ne Quelle" | Du kleine grünumwachs'ne Quelle
| data-sort-value="1817-02-01" | February1817
| data-sort-value="Text by Claudius, Matthias, Du kleine grunumwachs'ne Quelle" | Text by Claudius
|-
| 531
| 531
| data-sort-value="007,1823-3" | 7,3(1823)
| data-sort-value="2005,302" | XX, 5No. 302
| data-sort-value="401,0073" | IV, 1a
| data-sort-value="Tod und das Madchen, Der" | Der Tod und das Mädchen
| data-sort-value="text Voruber, ach voruber" | Vorüber, ach vorüber
| data-sort-value="1817-02-01" | February1817
| data-sort-value="Text by Claudius, Matthias, Voruber, ach voruber" | Text by Claudius; Music partly reappears in 
|-
| 532
| 532
| data-sort-value="XXX,1895" | (1895)
| data-sort-value="2005,303" | XX, 5No. 303
| data-sort-value="411,00" | IV, 11
| data-sort-value="Lied vom Reifen, Das" | Das Lied vom Reifen
| data-sort-value="text Seht meine lieben Baume an" | Seht meine lieben Bäume an
| data-sort-value="1817-02-01" | February1817
| data-sort-value="Text by Claudius, Matthias, Seht meine lieben Baume an" | Text by Claudius; Fragment (completed in AGA)
|-
| 533
| 533
| data-sort-value="XXX,1876" | (1876)(1895)
| data-sort-value="2005,304" | XX, 5No. 304
| data-sort-value="411,00" | IV, 11
| data-sort-value="Taglich zu singen" | Täglich zu singen
| data-sort-value="text Ich danke Gott und freue mich" | Ich danke Gott und freue mich
| data-sort-value="1817-02-01" | February1817
| data-sort-value="Text by Claudius, Matthias, Ich danke Gott und freue mich" | Text by Claudius; 1876 publ. is piano reduction
|-
| 534
| 534
| data-sort-value="XXX,1830" | (1830)
| data-sort-value="2005,305" | XX, 5No. 305
| data-sort-value="411,00" | IV, 11
| data-sort-value="Nacht, Die, D 534" | Die Nacht, D 534
| data-sort-value="text Die Nacht ist dumpfig und finster" | Die Nacht ist dumpfig und finster
| data-sort-value="1817-02-01" | February1817
| data-sort-value="Text by Macpherson, James (Ossian) from Domhnull mac Fhionnlaidh, Die Nacht ist dumpfig und finster" | Text by Macpherson (Ossian), from Domhnull mac Fhionnlaidh, transl. by E. Baron de Harold
|-
| 535
| 535
| data-sort-value="XXX,1853" | (1853)(1895)
| data-sort-value="2010,585" | XX, 10No. 585
| data-sort-value="301,00" | III, 1
| Lied, D 535
| data-sort-value="text Bruder, schrecklich brennt die Trane" | Brüder, schrecklich brennt die Träne
| data-sort-value="1817-02-01" | February1817
| For s and small orchestra; 1853 ed. is arrangement
|-
| 536
| 536
| data-sort-value="021,1823-2" | 21,2(1823)(1970)
| data-sort-value="2005,318" | XX, 5No. 318
| data-sort-value="401,0212" | IV, 1a &b No. 17
| data-sort-value="Schiffer, Der, D 536" | Der Schiffer, D 536
| data-sort-value="text Im winde, im Sturme" | Im winde, im Sturme
| data-sort-value="1817-01-01" | 1817?
| data-sort-value="Text by Mayrhofer, Johann, Im winde, im Sturme" | Text by Mayrhofer; For b and piano; Two versions: 2nd, in AGA, is Op. 21 No. 2
|-
| 537
| 537
| data-sort-value="164,1852.0" | 164p(1852)
| data-sort-value="1000,006" | X No. 6
| data-sort-value="721,04" | VII/2, 1No. 4
| Piano Sonata, D 537
| data-sort-value="key A minor" | A minor
| data-sort-value="1817-03-01" | March 1817
| Allegro ma non troppo – Allegretto quasi Andantino – Allegro vivace
|-
| 538
| 538
| data-sort-value="XXX,1891" | (1891)
| data-sort-value="1600,033" | XVINo. 33
| data-sort-value="304,42" | III, 4No. 42
| data-sort-value="Gesang der Geister uber den Wassern, D 538" | Gesang der Geister über den Wassern, D 538
| data-sort-value="text Des Menschen Seele gleicht dem Wasser 2" | Des Menschen Seele gleicht dem Wasser
| data-sort-value="1817-03-01" | March 1817
| data-sort-value="Text by Goethe, Johann Wolfgang von, Des Menschen Seele gleicht dem Wasser 2" | Text by Goethe (other settings: , 705 and 714); For ttbb
|-
| 539
| 539
| data-sort-value="008,1822-4" | 8,4(1822)
| data-sort-value="2005,306" | XX, 5No. 306
| data-sort-value="401,0084" | IV, 1a
| Am Strome
| data-sort-value="text Ist mir's doch, als sei mein Leben" | Ist mir's doch, als sei mein Leben
| data-sort-value="1817-03-01" | March 1817
| data-sort-value="Text by Mayrhofer, Johann, Ist mir's doch, als sei mein Leben" | Text by Mayrhofer
|-
| 540
| 540
| data-sort-value="XXX,1831" | (1831)
| data-sort-value="2005,307" | XX, 5No. 307
| data-sort-value="411,00" | IV, 11
| Philoktet
| data-sort-value="text Da sitz' ich ohne Bogen" | Da sitz' ich ohne Bogen
| data-sort-value="1817-03-01" | March 1817
| data-sort-value="Text by Mayrhofer, Johann, Da sitz' ich ohne Bogen" | Text by Mayrhofer
|-
| 541
| 541
| data-sort-value="006,1821-1" | 6,1(1821)
| data-sort-value="2005,308" | XX, 5No. 308
| data-sort-value="401,0061" | IV, 1a
| Memnon
| data-sort-value="text Den Tag hindurch nur einmal mag ich sprechen" | Den Tag hindurch nur einmal mag ich sprechen
| data-sort-value="1817-03-01" | March 1817
| data-sort-value="Text by Mayrhofer, Johann, Den Tag hindurch nur einmal mag ich sprechen" | Text by Mayrhofer
|-
| 542
| 542
| data-sort-value="006,1821-2" | 6,2(1821)
| data-sort-value="2005,309" | XX, 5No. 309
| data-sort-value="401,0062" | IV, 1a
| Antigone und Oedip
| data-sort-value="text Ihr hohen Himmlischen" | Ihr hohen Himmlischen
| data-sort-value="1817-03-01" | March 1817
| data-sort-value="Text by Mayrhofer, Johann, Ihr hohen Himmlischen" | Text by Mayrhofer
|-
| 543
| 543
| data-sort-value="092,1828-2" | 92,2(1828)(1895)
| data-sort-value="2005,310" | XX, 5No. 310
| data-sort-value="405,00" | IV, 5
| Auf dem See
| data-sort-value="text Und frische Nahrung" | Und frische Nahrung
| data-sort-value="1817-03-01" | March 1817
| data-sort-value="Text by Goethe, Johann Wolfgang von, Und frische Nahrung" | Text by Goethe; Two versions: 2nd is Op. 92 No. 2
|-
| 544
| 544
| data-sort-value="019,1825-3" | 19,3(1825)
| data-sort-value="2005,311" | XX, 5No. 311
| data-sort-value="401,0193" | IV, 1a
| Ganymed
| data-sort-value="text Wie im Morgenglanze" | Wie im Morgenglanze
| data-sort-value="1817-03-01" | March 1817
| data-sort-value="Text by Goethe, Johann Wolfgang von, Wie im Morgenglanze" | Text by Goethe
|-
| 545
| 545
| data-sort-value="XXX,1872" | (1872)(1895)
| data-sort-value="2005,312" | XX, 5No. 312
| data-sort-value="411,00" | IV, 11
| data-sort-value="Jungling und der Tod, Der" | Der Jüngling und der Tod
| data-sort-value="text Die Sonne sinkt, o konnt ich" | Die Sonne sinkt, o könnt ich
| data-sort-value="1817-03-01" | March 1817
| data-sort-value="Text by Spaun, Joseph von, Die Sonne sinkt, o konnt ich" | Text by Spaun; Two versions: 1st is duet – 2nd publ. 1872
|-
| 546
| 546
| data-sort-value="101,1827-3" | 101p,3(1827)
| data-sort-value="2005,313" | XX, 5No. 313
| data-sort-value="405,00" | IV, 5
| Trost im Liede
| data-sort-value="text Braust des Unglucks Sturm empor" | Braust des Unglücks Sturm empor
| data-sort-value="1817-03-01" | March 1817
| data-sort-value="Text by Schober, Franz von, Braust des Unglucks Sturm empor" | Text by Schober; Publ. as Op. posth. 101 No. 3 in 1828
|-
| 547
| 547
| data-sort-value="088,1827-4" | 88,4(1827)(1895)
| data-sort-value="2005,314" | XX, 5No. 314
| data-sort-value="404,00" | IV, 4
| An die Musik
| data-sort-value="text Du holde Kunst" | Du holde Kunst
| data-sort-value="1817-03-01" | March 1817
| data-sort-value="Text by Schober, Franz von, Du holde Kunst" | Text by Schober; Two versions: 2nd is Op. 88 No. 4
|-
| 548
| 548
| data-sort-value="XXX,1831" | (1831)
| data-sort-value="2006,382" | XX, 6No. 382
| data-sort-value="411,00" | IV, 11
| Orest auf Tauris
| data-sort-value="text Ist dies Tauris" | Ist dies Tauris
| data-sort-value="1817-03-01" | March 1817
| data-sort-value="Text by Mayrhofer, Johann, Ist dies Tauris" | Text by Mayrhofer
|-
| 549
| 549
| data-sort-value="XXX,1895" | (1895)
| data-sort-value="2010,595" | XX, 10No. 595
| data-sort-value="413,00" | IV, 13
| Mahomets Gesang, D 549
| data-sort-value="text Seht den Felsenquell 1" | Seht den Felsenquell
| data-sort-value="1817-03-01" | March 1817
| data-sort-value="Text by Goethe, Johann Wolfgang von, Seht den Felsenquell 1" | Text by Goethe; Fragment
|-
| 550
| 550
| data-sort-value="032,1820-0" | 32(1820)(1895)(1975)
| data-sort-value="2005,327" | XX, 5No. 327
| data-sort-value="402,0320" | IV, 2a &b No. 3
| data-sort-value="Forelle, Die" | Die Forelle
| data-sort-value="text In einem Bachlein helle" | In einem Bächlein helle
| data-sort-value="1817-03-01" | late 1816–October 1821
| data-sort-value="Text by Schubart, Christian Friedrich Daniel, In einem Bachlein helle" | Text by Schubart; Five versions: 1st–4th in AGA – 4th publ. as Op. 32 in 1827; Music partly reappears in 
|-
| 551
| 551
| data-sort-value="XXX,1831" | (1831)
| data-sort-value="2005,315" | XX, 5No. 315
| data-sort-value="411,00" | IV, 11
| Pax vobiscum
| data-sort-value="text Der Friede sei mit euch!" | Der Friede sei mit euch!
| data-sort-value="1817-04-01" | April 1817
| data-sort-value="Text by Schober, Franz von, Der Friede sei mit euch!" | Text by Schober
|-
| 552
| 552
| data-sort-value="020,1823-3" | 20,3(1823)(1970)
| data-sort-value="2005,316" | XX, 5No. 316
| data-sort-value="401,0203" | IV, 1a &b No. 16
| data-sort-value="Hanflings Liebeswerbung" | Hänflings Liebeswerbung
| data-sort-value="text Ahidi! ich liebe" | Ahidi! ich liebe
| data-sort-value="1817-04-01" | April 1817
| data-sort-value="Text by Kind, Johann Friedrich, Ahidi! ich liebe" | Text by Kind; Two versions: 2nd, in AGA, is Op. 20 No. 3; Music related to  No. 3
|-
| 553
| 553
| data-sort-value="021,1823-1" | 21,1(1823)
| data-sort-value="2005,317" | XX, 5No. 317
| data-sort-value="401,0211" | IV, 1a
| Auf der Donau
| data-sort-value="text Auf der Wellen Spiegel" | Auf der Wellen Spiegel
| data-sort-value="1817-04-01" | April 1817
| data-sort-value="Text by Mayrhofer, Johann, Auf der Wellen Spiegel" | Text by Mayrhofer; For b and piano
|-
| 554
| 554
| data-sort-value="XXX,1895" | (1895)
| data-sort-value="2005,319" | XX, 5No. 319
| data-sort-value="411,00" | IV, 11
| Uraniens Flucht
| data-sort-value="text Lasst uns, ihr Himmlischen, ein Fest begehen!" | Laßt uns, ihr Himmlischen, ein Fest begehen!
| data-sort-value="1817-04-01" | April 1817
| data-sort-value="Text by Mayrhofer, Johann, Lasst uns, ihr Himmlischen, ein Fest begehen!" | Text by Mayrhofer
|-
| 555
| 555
| data-sort-value="XXX,1934" | (1934)
| data-sort-value="ZZZZ" |
| data-sort-value="411,00" | IV, 11
| Liedentwurf, D 555
| data-sort-value="key A minor" | A minor
| data-sort-value="1817-05-01" | May 1817?
| Sketch without text
|-
| 556
| 556
| data-sort-value="XXX,1886" | (1886)
| data-sort-value="0200,004" | II No. 4
| data-sort-value="505,05" | V, 5
| Overture, D 556
| data-sort-value="key D major" | D major
| data-sort-value="1817-05-01" | May 1817
| For orchestra
|-
| 557
| 557
| data-sort-value="XXX,1888" | (1888)
| data-sort-value="1000,003" | X No. 3
| data-sort-value="721,05" | VII/2, 1No. 5
| Piano Sonata, D 557
| data-sort-value="key A-flat major" | A major
| data-sort-value="1817-05-01" | May 1817
| Allegro moderato – Andante – Allegro
|-
| 558
| 558
| data-sort-value="XXX,1887" | (1887)
| data-sort-value="2003,120" | XX, 3No. 120
| data-sort-value="411,00" | IV, 11
| Liebhaber in allen Gestalten
| data-sort-value="text Ich wollt', ich war' ein Fisch" | Ich wollt', ich wär' ein Fisch
| data-sort-value="1817-05-01" | May 1817
| data-sort-value="Text by Goethe, Johann Wolfgang von, Ich wollt', ich war' ein Fisch" | Text by Goethe
|-
| 559
| 559
| data-sort-value="XXX,1885" | (1885)
| data-sort-value="2003,121" | XX, 3No. 121
| data-sort-value="411,00" | IV, 11
| Schweizerlied
| data-sort-value="text Uf'm Bergli bin i g'sasse" | Uf'm Bergli bin i g'sässe
| data-sort-value="1817-05-01" | May 1817
| data-sort-value="Text by Goethe, Johann Wolfgang von, Uf'm Bergli bin i g'sasse" | Text by Goethe
|-
| 560
| 560
| data-sort-value="XXX,1850" | (1850)
| data-sort-value="2003,122" | XX, 3No. 122
| data-sort-value="411,00" | IV, 11
| data-sort-value="Goldschmiedsgesell, Der" | Der Goldschmiedsgesell
| data-sort-value="text Es ist doch meine Nachbarin" | Es ist doch meine Nachbarin
| data-sort-value="1817-05-01" | May 1817
| data-sort-value="Text by Goethe, Johann Wolfgang von, Es ist doch meine Nachbarin" | Text by Goethe
|-
| 561
| 561
| data-sort-value="XXX,1872" | (1872)
| data-sort-value="2005,320" | XX, 5No. 320
| data-sort-value="411,00" | IV, 11
| Nach einem Gewitter
| data-sort-value="text Auf den Blumen" | Auf den Blumen
| data-sort-value="1817-05-01" | May 1817
| data-sort-value="Text by Mayrhofer, Johann, Auf den Blumen" | Text by Mayrhofer
|-
| 562
| 562
| data-sort-value="XXX,1895" | (1895)
| data-sort-value="2005,321" | XX, 5No. 321
| data-sort-value="411,00" | IV, 11
| Fischerlied, D 562
| data-sort-value="text Das Fischergewerbe gibt rustigen Mut 3" | Das Fischergewerbe gibt rüstigen Mut
| data-sort-value="1817-05-01" | May 1817
| data-sort-value="Text by Salis-Seewis, Johann Gaudenz von, Das Fischergewerbe gibt rustigen Mut 3" | Text by Salis-Seewis (other settings:  and 364)
|-
| 563
| 563
| data-sort-value="XXX,1887" | (1887)
| data-sort-value="2005,322" | XX, 5No. 322
| data-sort-value="411,00" | IV, 11
| data-sort-value="Einsiedelei, Die, D 563" | Die Einsiedelei, D 563
| data-sort-value="text Es rieselt klar und wehend ein Quell 3" | Es rieselt klar und wehend ein Quell
| data-sort-value="1817-05-01" | May 1817
| data-sort-value="Text by Salis-Seewis, Johann Gaudenz von, Es rieselt klar und wehend ein Quell 3" | Text by Salis-Seewis (other settings:  and 393)
|-
| 564
| 564
| data-sort-value="XXX,1838" | (1838)
| data-sort-value="2010,596" | XX, 10No. 596
| data-sort-value="411,00" | IV, 11
| Gretchen im Zwinger a.k.a. Gretchens Bitte
| data-sort-value="text Ach neige, du Schmerzensreiche" | Ach neige, du Schmerzensreiche
| data-sort-value="1817-05-01" | May 1817
| data-sort-value="Text by Goethe, Johann Wolfgang von from Faust I, 18 Ach neige, du Schmerzensreiche" | Text by Goethe, from Faust I, 18; Fragment
|-
| 565
| 565
| data-sort-value="XXX,1876" | (1876)
| data-sort-value="2005,324" | XX, 5No. 324
| data-sort-value="411,00" | IV, 11
| data-sort-value="Strom, Der" | Der Strom
| data-sort-value="text Mein Leben walzt sich murrend fort" | Mein Leben wälzt sich murrend fort
| data-sort-value="1817-06-01" | June 1817?
| For b and piano
|-
| 566
| 566
| data-sort-value="XXX,1888" | (1888)(1907)(1928-29)
| data-sort-value="1000,004" | X No. 4
| data-sort-value="721,06" | VII/2, 1 No. 6& Anh. No. 3
| Piano Sonata, D 566
| data-sort-value="key E minor" | E minor
| data-sort-value="1817-06-01" | June 1817
| Moderato (in AGA) – Allegretto (publ. 1907) – Scherzo (publ. 1928/29);  4th movement?
|-
| data-sort-value="567" | 567568
| 568
| data-sort-value="122,1829-0" | 122p(1829)(1897)
| data-sort-value="1000,007" | X No. 7XXI, 2No. 9
| data-sort-value="721,07" | VII/2, 1 No. 7& Anh. Nos. 4–6
| data-sort-value="Piano Sonata, D 568" | Piano Sonata in D major, D 568; Piano Sonata in E major, D 568
| data-sort-value="key D-flat major / E-flat major" | D major;E major
| data-sort-value="1817-06-01" | June 1817
| Two versions: 1st, in D major, composed June 1817 – 2nd, in E major, is Op. posth. 122; Allegro moderato – Andante molto – Minuet (2nd version only,  No. 2 for 1st version?) – Allegro moderato (2nd version), Allegretto (fragment,  1st version)
|-
| 569
| 569
| data-sort-value="XXX,1895" | (1895)
| data-sort-value="2005,323" | XX, 5No. 323
| data-sort-value="303,17" | III, 3 No. 17
| data-sort-value="Grab, Das, D 569" | Das Grab, D 569
| data-sort-value="text Das Grab ist tief und stille 4" | Das Grab ist tief und stille
| data-sort-value="1817-06-01" | June 1817
| data-sort-value="Text by Salis-Seewis, Johann Gaudenz von, Das Grab ist tief und stille 4" | Text by Salis-Seewis (other settings: , 330, 377 and 643A); For unison men's choir and piano
|-
| 570
| 570
| data-sort-value="XXX,1897" | (1897)
| data-sort-value="2103,020" | XXI, 3No. 20
| data-sort-value="721,08" | VII/2, 1 No. 8 Anh. Nos. 8–9
| Scherzo and Allegro
| data-sort-value="key D major / F-sharp minor" | D major (scherzo)F minor (allegro)
| data-sort-value="1817-07-01" | July 1817?
| For piano; Allegro is fragment; Last movements of ?
|-
| 571
| 571
| data-sort-value="XXX,1897" | (1897)
| data-sort-value="2102,010" | XXI, 2No. 10
| data-sort-value="721,A7" | VII/2, 1Anh. No. 7
| Piano Sonata, D 571
| data-sort-value="key F-sharp minor" | F minor
| data-sort-value="1817-07-01" | July 1817
| Allegro moderato; Fragment; Completed by ( and) 570?
|-
| 572
| 572
| data-sort-value="XXX,1872" | (1872)
| data-sort-value="1600,034" | XVINo. 34
| data-sort-value="304,43" | III, 4No. 43
| Lied im Freien, D 572
| data-sort-value="text Wie schon ist's im Freien 1" | Wie schön ist's im Freien
| data-sort-value="1817-07-01" | July 1817
| data-sort-value="Text by Salis-Seewis, Johann Gaudenz von, Wie schon ist's im Freien 1" | Text by Salis-Seewis (other setting: ; For ttbb
|-
| 573
| 573
| data-sort-value="098,1829-3" | 98,3(1829)
| data-sort-value="2005,325" | XX, 5No. 325
| data-sort-value="405,00" | IV, 5
| Iphigenia
| data-sort-value="text Bluht denn hier an Tauris Strande" | Blüht denn hier an Tauris Strande
| data-sort-value="1817-07-01" | July 1817
| data-sort-value="Text by Mayrhofer, Johann, Bluht denn hier an Tauris Strande" | Text by Mayrhofer
|-
| 574
| 574
| data-sort-value="162,1851-0" | 162p(1851)
| data-sort-value="0800,006" | VIIINo. 6
| data-sort-value="608,04" | VI, 8 No. 4
| Violin Sonata, D 574, a.k.a. (Grand) Duo
| data-sort-value="key A major" | A major
| data-sort-value="1817-08-01" | August 1817
| Allegro moderato – Scherzo – Andantino – Allegro vivace
|-
| 575
| 575
| data-sort-value="147,1846-0" | 147p(1846)
| data-sort-value="1000,005" | X No. 5
| data-sort-value="721,09" | VII/2, 1 No. 9& Anh. No. 10
| Piano Sonata, D 575
| data-sort-value="key B major" | B major
| data-sort-value="1817-08-01" | August 1817
| Allegro ma non troppo – Andante – Scherzo – Allegro giusto
|-
| 576
| 576
| data-sort-value="XXX,1867" | (1867)
| data-sort-value="1100,007" | XI No. 7
| data-sort-value="724,00" | VII/2, 4
| data-sort-value="Variations, 13, on a theme by Anselm Huttenbrenner" | 13 Variations on a theme by Anselm Hüttenbrenner
| data-sort-value="key A minor" | A minor
| data-sort-value="1817-08-01" | August 1817
| For piano
|-
| 577
| 577
| data-sort-value="XXX,1895" | (1895)
| data-sort-value="2010,597" | XX, 10No. 597
| data-sort-value="410,00" | IV, 10
| data-sort-value="Entzuckung an Laura, D 577" | Entzückung an Laura, D 577
| data-sort-value="text Laura, uber diese Welt 2" | Laura, über diese Welt
| data-sort-value="1817-08-01" | August 1817
| data-sort-value="Text by Schiller, Friedrich, Laura, uber diese Welt 2" | Text by Schiller; Two fragments of a sketch
|-
| 578
| 578
| data-sort-value="XXX,1838" | (1838)
| data-sort-value="2010,586" | XX, 10No. 586
| data-sort-value="411,00" | IV, 11
| Abschied, D 578
| data-sort-value="text Lebe wohl! Du lieber Freund!" | Lebe wohl! Du lieber Freund!
| data-sort-value="1817-08-24" | 24/08/1817
| data-sort-value="Text by Schubert, Franz, Lebe wohl! Du lieber Freund!" | Text by Schubert
|-
| 579
| 579
| data-sort-value="XXX,1872" | (1872)(1897)
| data-sort-value="2005,335" | XX, 5No. 335XXII, 11No. 335
| data-sort-value="411,00" | IV, 11
| data-sort-value="Knabe in der Wiege, Der" | Der Knabe in der Wiege
| data-sort-value="text Er schlaft so suss" | Er schläft so süß
| data-sort-value="1817-09-21" | Autumn1817
|-
| 989
| 579A
| data-sort-value="XXX,1970" | (1970)
| data-sort-value="ZZZZ" |
| data-sort-value="411,00" | IV, 11
| Vollendung
| data-sort-value="text Wenn ich einst das Ziel errungen habe" | Wenn ich einst das Ziel errungen habe
| data-sort-value="1817-09-01" | Sept. or Oct.1817?
| data-sort-value="Text by Matthisson, Friedrich von, Wenn ich einst das Ziel errungen habe" | Text by Matthisson
|-
| 989A
| 579B
| data-sort-value="XXX,1970" | (1970)
| data-sort-value="ZZZZ" |
| data-sort-value="411,00" | IV, 11
| data-sort-value="Erde, Die" | Die Erde
| data-sort-value="text Wenn sanft entzuckt mein Auge sieht" | Wenn sanft entzückt mein Auge sieht
| data-sort-value="1817-09-01" | Sept. or Oct.1817?
| data-sort-value="Text by Matthisson, Friedrich von, Wenn sanft entzuckt mein Auge sieht" | Text by Matthisson
|-
| 580
| 580
| data-sort-value="XXX,1928" | (1928)
| data-sort-value="ZZZZ" |
| data-sort-value="507,03" | V, 7 No. 3
| Polonaise, D 580
| data-sort-value="key B-flat major" | B major
| data-sort-value="1817-09-01" | September1817
| For violin and orchestra
|-
| 581
| 581
| data-sort-value="XXX,1897" | (1897)
| data-sort-value="2101,005" | XXI, 1No. 5
| data-sort-value="606,02" | VI, 6 No. 2–3
| String Trio, D 581
| data-sort-value="key B-flat major" | B major
| data-sort-value="1817-09-01" | September1817
| Allegro moderato – Andante – Minuet – Rondo
|-
| 583
| 583
| data-sort-value="024,1823-1" | 24,1(1823)
| data-sort-value="2005,328" | XX, 5No. 328
| data-sort-value="402,0241" | IV, 2a
| Gruppe aus dem Tartarus, D 583
| data-sort-value="text Horch, wie Murmeln des emporten Meeres 2" | Horch, wie Murmeln des empörten Meeres
| data-sort-value="1817-09-01" | September1817
| data-sort-value="Text by Schiller, Friedrich from Gruppe aus dem Tartarus 00 2" | Text by Schiller (other settings:  and 396)
|-
| 584
| 584
| data-sort-value="XXX,1830" | (1830)
| data-sort-value="2005,329" | XX, 5No. 329
| data-sort-value="411,00" | IV, 11
| Elysium
| data-sort-value="text Voruber die stohnende Klage! 2" | Vorüber die stöhnende Klage!
| data-sort-value="1817-09-01" | September1817
| data-sort-value="Text by Schiller, Friedrich from Elysium 00" | Text by Schiller (settings of separate stanzas: , 53, 54, 57, 58 and 60)
|-
| 585
| 585
| data-sort-value="XXX,1833" | (1833)
| data-sort-value="2005,330" | XX, 5No. 330
| data-sort-value="411,00" | IV, 11
| Atys
| data-sort-value="text Der Knabe seufzt ubers grune Meer" | Der Knabe seufzt übers grüne Meer
| data-sort-value="1817-09-01" | September1817
| data-sort-value="Text by Mayrhofer, Johann, Der Knabe seufzt ubers grune Meer" | Text by Mayrhofer
|-
| 586
| 586
| data-sort-value="008,1818-3" | 8,3(1818)
| data-sort-value="2005,331" | XX, 5No. 331
| data-sort-value="401,0083" | IV, 1a
| Erlafsee
| data-sort-value="text Mir ist so wohl, so weh'" | Mir ist so wohl, so weh'
| data-sort-value="1817-09-01" | September1817
| data-sort-value="Text by Mayrhofer, Johann, Mir ist so wohl, so weh'" | Text by Mayrhofer; Publ. as Op. 8 No. 3 in 1822
|-
| data-sort-value="587" | 587245
| 587
| data-sort-value="XXX,1885" | (1885)(1895)
| data-sort-value="2003,107" | XX, 3No. 107
| data-sort-value="411,00" | IV, 11
| data-sort-value="An den Fruhling, D 587" | An den Frühling, D 587
| data-sort-value="text Willkommen, schoner Jungling! 3" | Willkommen, schöner Jüngling!
| data-sort-value="1817-10-01" | October1817
| data-sort-value="Text by Schiller, Friedrich, Willkommen, schoner Jungling! 3" | Text by Schiller (other settings:  and 338); Two versions: 1st publ. 1885 – 2nd was 
|-
| 588
| 588
| data-sort-value="037,1825-2" | 37,2(1825)(1897)(1975)
| data-sort-value="2005,332" | XX, 5No. 332XXII, 11No. 332
| data-sort-value="402,0372" | IV, 2a &b No. 7
| data-sort-value="Alpenjager, Der, D 588" | Der Alpenjäger, D 588
| data-sort-value="text Willst du nicht das Lammlein huten?" | Willst du nicht das Lämmlein hüten?
| data-sort-value="1817-10-01" | October1817
| data-sort-value="Text by Schiller, Friedrich, Willst du nicht das Lammlein huten?" | Text by Schiller; Two versions: 1st incomplete in AGA – 2nd is Op. 37 No. 2
|-
| 589
| 589
| data-sort-value="XXX,1885" | (1885)
| data-sort-value="0102,006" | I, 2No. 6
| data-sort-value="502,06" | V, 2No. 6
| data-sort-value="Symphony No. 06" | Symphony No. 6Little C major
| data-sort-value="key C major" | C major
| data-sort-value="1818-02-01" | Oct. 1817–Feb. 1818
| Adagio, Allegro – Andante – Scherzo – Allegro moderato
|-
| 590
| 590
| data-sort-value="XXX,1886" | (1886)
| data-sort-value="0200,005" | II No. 5
| data-sort-value="505,06" | V, 5
| Overture in the Italian Style, D 590
| data-sort-value="key D major" | D major
| data-sort-value="1817-11-01" | November1817
| For orchestra; Piano duet arrangement: ; Music partly reappears in 
|-
| 591
| 591
| data-sort-value="170,1865-0" | 170p(1865)
| data-sort-value="0200,006" | II No. 6
| data-sort-value="505,07" | V, 5
| Overture in the Italian Style, D 591
| data-sort-value="key C major" | C major
| data-sort-value="1817-11-01" | November1817
| For orchestra; Piano duet arrangement: 
|-
| 592
| 592
| data-sort-value="XXX,1872" | (1872)
| data-sort-value="0902,010" | IX, 2No. 10
| data-sort-value="715,01" | VII/1, 5No. 1
| Overture in the Italian Style, D 592
| data-sort-value="key D major" | D major
| data-sort-value="1817-12-01" | December1817
| For piano duet; Arrangement of 
|-
| 593
| 593
| data-sort-value="XXX,1871" | (1871)
| data-sort-value="1100,015" | XI No. 15
| data-sort-value="724,00" | VII/2, 4
| data-sort-value="Scherzos, 2" | Two Scherzi
| data-sort-value="key I" | Various keys
| data-sort-value="1817-11-01" | November1817
| For piano; No. 2 related to 
|-
| 594
| 594
| data-sort-value="110,1829-0" | 110p(1829)
| data-sort-value="2005,333" | XX, 5No. 333
| data-sort-value="411,00" | IV, 11
| data-sort-value="Kampf, Der" | Der Kampf
| data-sort-value="text Nein, langer werd' ich diesen Kampf nicht kampfen" | Nein, länger werd' ich diesen Kampf nicht kämpfen
| data-sort-value="1817-11-01" | November1817
| data-sort-value="Text by Schiller, Friedrich, Nein, langer werd' ich diesen Kampf nicht kampfen" | Text by Schiller; For b and piano
|-
| 595
| 595
| data-sort-value="088,1827-2" | 88,2(1827)(1895)
| data-sort-value="2005,334" | XX, 5No. 334
| data-sort-value="404,00" | IV, 4
| data-sort-value="Thekla: Eine Geisterstimme, D 595" | Thekla: Eine Geisterstimme, D 595
| data-sort-value="text Wo ich sei, und wo mich hingewendet 2" | Wo ich sei, und wo mich hingewendet
| data-sort-value="1817-11-01" | November1817
| data-sort-value="Text by Schiller, Friedrich, Wo ich sei, und wo mich hingewendet 2" | Text by Schiller; Two versions: 2nd is Op. 88 No. 2
|-
| 596
| 596
| data-sort-value="XXX,1895" | (1895)
| data-sort-value="2010,598" | XX, 10No. 598
| data-sort-value="411,00" | IV, 11
| Lied eines Kindes
| data-sort-value="text Lauter Freude fuhl' ich" | Lauter Freude fühl' ich
| data-sort-value="1817-11-01" | November1817
| Fragment
|-
| 597
| 597
| data-sort-value="XXX,1872" | (1872)
| data-sort-value="0902,009" | IX, 2No. 9
| data-sort-value="715,02" | VII/1, 5No. 2
| Overture in the Italian Style, D 597
| data-sort-value="key C major" | C major
| data-sort-value="1817-11-01" | Nov. or Dec.1817
| For piano duet; Arrangement of 
|-
| 597A
| 597A
| data-sort-value="ZZZZ" |
| data-sort-value="ZZZZ" |
| data-sort-value="ZZZZ" |
| Variations
| data-sort-value="key A major" | A major
| data-sort-value="1817-12-01" | December1817
| Lost sketch for violin
|-
| data-sort-value="598" | 598641
| 598
| data-sort-value="011,1822-1" | 11,1(1822)(1891)
| data-sort-value="1600,004" | XVINo. 4 &No. 46
| data-sort-value="303,24" | III, 3 No. 24Anh. IV No. 4
| data-sort-value="Dorfchen, Das" | Das Dörfchen
| data-sort-value="text Ich ruhme mir mein Dorfchen hier" | Ich rühme mir mein Dörfchen hier
| data-sort-value="1817-12-01" | December1817
| data-sort-value="Text by Burger, Gottfried August, Ich ruhme mir mein Dorfchen hier" | Text by Bürger; For ttbb and piano; Two versions: 1st is sketch without piano – 2nd, Op. 11 No. 1, was 
|}

Lists of compositions by Franz Schubert
Compositions by Franz Schubert
Schubert